Plaistow (  or  ) is a London Underground station on Plaistow Road in the London Borough of Newham in Greater London. It is between West Ham and Upton Park stations on the District and Hammersmith & City lines, and in Travelcard Zone 3.

History
The London, Tilbury and Southend Railway direct line from Bow to Barking was constructed east to west through the middle of the Parish of West Ham in 1858. Before this, trains took a longer route to the north via Stratford and Forest Gate on the Eastern Counties Railway's line. The new line opened with stations initially at Bromley, Plaistow and East Ham. Upton Park was added as a new station to the east in 1877 and West Ham was added to the west in 1901. From 18 May 1869 the North London Railway ran a daily service to Plaistow via the Bow–Bromley curve, terminating at the northern bay platform. In 1905 the service switched to a new bay platform on the southern side. The North London Railway service to Plaistow ceased on 1 January 1916.

With the completion of the Whitechapel and Bow Railway in 1902 the line was doubled to four tracks and through services of the Metropolitan District Railway (commonly known as the District Railway) were able to operate to Upminster. The District Railway converted to electric trains in 1905 and services were cut back to East Ham. The District Railway was incorporated into London Transport in 1933, and became known as the District line.

The 1947 timetable shows only a few services a day on the main lines and a frequent service provided by the District line. The remaining Fenchurch Street–Southend services were withdrawn in 1962 when the LT&SR route was electrified with overhead lines.

Ownership of the station passed to the Midland Railway in 1912 and the London, Midland and Scottish Railway in 1923. After nationalisation of the railways in 1948 management of the station passed to British Railways. In 1969 ownership was transferred to the London Underground.

Design
The station has three platforms in use, comprising two through platforms and a third bay platform enabling eastbound trains to terminate and reverse back to central London. Two other platforms used to serve the LTSR line but are now closed and derelict; c2c trains pass through non-stop. Plaistow used to have sidings on the north side of the line, but the site is now derelict, having formerly been occupied by a Dagenham Motors car showroom.

The station booking hall, built in 1905, is the subject of a local listing which, while not conferring any additional planning controls on a building under current legislation, encourages the proper consideration of a building's architectural or historic interest(s) in the exercise of normal planning controls.

Works and engine sheds
Plaistow railway works were built adjacent to the station on the north side of the line to the west of the station in 1879 to 1880. A separate engine shed was opened in 1899 adjoining the western end of the works. The locomotive works closed in 1925, with responsibility being transferred to Bow railway works which were a short distance away. Carriage and wagon work lasted until 1932 when that work was transferred to Wolverton railway works.

On 30 September 1911 a new depot—initially called "West Ham"—opened on the south side of the line and this became a Midland Railway depot in 1912 when the Midland Railway took over the London Tilbury and Southend Railway (LTSR) and then a London, Midland and Scottish Railway (LMS) shed in 1923 following the grouping, when it was allocated the 13a depot code. Following nationalization in 1948 the depot was initially part of British Railways London Midland Region, although on 20 February 1949 it transferred to the Eastern Region. The depot code was changed to 33A which it retained until November 1959. From then until closure in 1962 it was a sub-shed of Tilbury (33B), then closed following electrification of the LTSR system.

In 1950 Plaistow had an allocation of 83 locomotives, the majority (70) of which were tank engines for passenger traffic to and from Fenchurch Street with 6 freight engines and 7 shunting engines making up the balance.

Location
Although there is no station car park, there is a Newham London Borough Council-run pay and display car park to the immediate south, connected by a set of steps, although this is currently closed for neighbouring building works expected to run until 2023.

Buses
London Buses routes 69, 241, 262 and 473 serve the station.

References

External links

Photos of Plaistow tube station
BBC News on the restoration

Hammersmith & City line stations
District line stations
Tube stations in the London Borough of Newham
Former London, Tilbury and Southend Railway stations
Railway stations in Great Britain opened in 1858
Tube station
Railway depots in London
1858 in London